Sir Michael John Hopkins  (born 7 May 1935) is an English architect.

Career
Michael Hopkins was born in Poole, Dorset, and educated at Sherborne School and trained at the Architectural Association. He worked for Frederick Gibberd before entering into partnership with Norman Foster, where he was the project architect of the Willis Faber headquarters in Ipswich. With Norman Foster, Richard Rogers, Terry Farrell and Nicholas Grimshaw, Hopkins was one of the leading figures in the introduction of high-tech architecture into Britain.

In 1976 Hopkins set up what became Hopkins Architects in partnership with his wife, Patricia, who had ran her own practice. One of their first buildings was their own house in Hampstead, a lightweight steel structure with glass façades. Early Hopkins Architects' buildings, such as the Greene King brewery in Bury St Edmunds and the Schlumberger laboratories near Cambridge, used new materials and construction techniques. The firm challenged conventional architectural wisdom by demonstrating that lightweight steel-and-glass structures could be energy efficient and pioneered the use in Britain of permanent lightweight fabric structures, of which the Mound Stand at Lord's Cricket Ground is a notable example.  From the mid-1980s the practice began to explore what they called the "updating of the traditional materials", adding to the expressive potential of traditional crafts like masonry and carpentry by combining them with contemporary engineering. The practice became recognised for its combination of ultra-modern techniques with traditional architecture, broadening their palette of materials and forms.

Together Michael and Patty Hopkins received the Royal Institute of British Architects Royal Gold Medal, awarded in 1994. The citation describes the Hopkins' work as "not only a matter of exploiting technology to build beautifully, nor simply of accommodating difficult and changing tasks in the most elegant way, but above all of capturing in stone and transmitting in bronze the finest aspirations of our age", praising their contribution to the debate about the "delicate relationship between modernity and tradition" and adding: "For Hopkins, progress is no longer a break with the past but rather an act of continuity where he deftly and intelligently integrates traditional elements such as stone and wood, with advanced and environmentally responsible technology."

Michael Hopkins was elected to the Royal Academy in 1992 and appointed a CBE and knighted for services to architecture.

Examples of work
Rose Bowl (cricket ground)

Gallery

References

External links

Practice web site

1935 births
Living people
People from Poole
Modernist architects from England
20th-century English architects
People educated at Sherborne School
Commanders of the Order of the British Empire
Knights Bachelor
Recipients of the Royal Gold Medal
Alumni of the Architectural Association School of Architecture
Alumni of Arts University Bournemouth
Royal Academicians
People from Dorset